Courcelles-sous-Thoix (literally Courcelles under Thoix) is a commune in the Somme department in Hauts-de-France in northern France.

Geography

Places of interest
 The château des Alleux, in Louis XIII style. Now a hotel.

Population

See also
 Communes of the Somme department

References

Communes of Somme (department)